The 1940 Michigan State Normal Hurons football team represented Michigan State Normal College (later renamed Eastern Michigan University) during the 1940 college football season. In their 19th season under head coach Elton Rynearson, the Hurons compiled a record of 1–5–1, failed to score in four of seven games, and were outscored by all opponents by a combined total of 125 to 34. Walter Siera was the team captain. The team played its home games at Briggs Field on the school's campus in Ypsilanti, Michigan.

Schedule

References

Michigan State Normal
Eastern Michigan Eagles football seasons
Michigan State Normal Hurons football